The 192nd Ohio Infantry Regiment, sometimes 192nd Ohio Volunteer Infantry (or 192nd OVI) was an infantry regiment in the Union Army during the American Civil War.

Service
The 192nd Ohio Infantry was organized at Camp Chase in Columbus, Ohio, and mustered in for one year service on March 9, 1865, under the command of Colonel Francis W. Butterfield.

The regiment left Ohio for Harpers Ferry, West Virginia, March 10. Attached to 2nd Brigade, 1st Provisional Division, Army of the Shenandoah, March 20. Marched to Charleston March. 21. Duty there until April 4. Transferred to 2nd (Ohio) Brigade, 2nd Provisional Division, March 27. Marched to Winchester April 4. Duty in the Shenandoah Valley in the vicinity of Winchester, Stevenson's Depot, Reed's Hill, and Harrisonburg until August 25. Mustered out at Winchester September 1, 1865.

The 192nd Ohio Infantry mustered out of service September 1, 1865, at Winchester, Virginia.

Members of this Unit Included:
Company C:
Michael Gessner b. June 18, 1830, d. March 4, 1911 (m. Magdalena Vesper Dec. 20, 1851)

Casualties
The regiment lost a total of 27 enlisted men during service; 1 man killed and 26 men died of disease.

Commanders
 Colonel Francis W. Butterfield

See also

 List of Ohio Civil War units
 Ohio in the Civil War

References
 Dyer, Frederick H. A Compendium of the War of the Rebellion (Des Moines, IA:  Dyer Pub. Co.), 1908.
 Ohio Roster Commission. Official Roster of the Soldiers of the State of Ohio in the War on the Rebellion, 1861–1865, Compiled Under the Direction of the Roster Commission (Akron, OH: Werner Co.), 1886–1895.
 Reid, Whitelaw. Ohio in the War: Her Statesmen, Her Generals, and Soldiers (Cincinnati, OH: Moore, Wilstach, & Baldwin), 1868. 
Attribution

External links
 Ohio in the Civil War: 192nd Ohio Volunteer Infantry by Larry Stevens
 National flag of the 192nd Ohio Infantry
 Regimental flag of the 192nd Ohio Infantry
 Guidon of the 192nd Ohio Infantry

Military units and formations established in 1865
Military units and formations disestablished in 1865
Units and formations of the Union Army from Ohio
1865 establishments in Ohio